On a Mission was released in Europe in 2001 to coincide with a Buck-O-Nine tour of the UK. It features tracks from Songs in the Key of Bree, Barfly and Water in My Head.

Track listing
"On a Mission" [Video Track]  
"Calling in Sick"
"Barfly"
"Water in My Head"
"Pass the Dutchie" 
"More Than Your Eyes Can See"
"Poor Boy"
"Dr Kitch" 
"Few Too Many"
"Junior"
"Milk"
"Positively Shelby"
"Full Metal Bree"
"Sound System"
"True or False"

Credits

Performance
Jon Pebsworth - Vocals
Jonas Kleiner - Guitar
Dan Albert - Trombone
Anthony Curry - Trumpet
Craig Yarnold - Alto Sax
Scott Kennerly - Bass
Steve Bauer - Drums

Production
Track 1 (video) recorded in Boston, MA
Tracks 1-7, 9, 10, 13-15 recorded at DoubleTime Studios by Jeff Forrest
Tracks 3, 8, 11, 12 recorded at Paramount Studio, Hollywood, CA
Cover Artwork: Jonas Kleiner

2001 compilation albums
Buck-O-Nine albums